German declension is the paradigm that German uses to define all the ways articles, adjectives and sometimes nouns can change their form to reflect their role in the sentence: subject, object, etc.  Declension allows speakers to mark a difference between subjects, direct objects, indirect objects and possessives by changing the form of the word—and/or its associated article—instead of indicating this meaning through word order or prepositions (e.g. English, Spanish, French). As a result, German can take a much more fluid approach to word order without the meaning being obscured. In English, a simple sentence must be written in strict word order (ex. A man eats an apple). This sentence cannot be expressed in any other word order than how it is written here without changing the meaning. A translation of the same sentence from German to English would appear rather different (ex. "Ein Mann isst einen Apfel" (a man)-subject eats (an apple)-direct object) and can be expressed with a variety of word order (ex. "Einen Apfel isst ein Mann (an apple)-direct object is eaten by (a man)-subject) with little or no change in meaning.

As a fusional language, German marks nouns, pronouns, articles, and adjectives to distinguish case, number, and gender. For example, all German adjectives have several different forms. The adjective neu (new), for example, can be written in five different ways (neue, neuer, neues, neuen, neuem) depending on the gender of the noun that it modifies, whether the noun is singular or plural, and the role of the noun in the sentence. English lacks such declinations (except for rare and  exceptional ones, such as blond/blonde) so that adjectives take only one form, or in the case of pronouns, such as I, me, my, mine, she, her, etc., which show the remnants of nominative, accusative, and genitive case markings.

Modern High German distinguishes between four cases—nominative, accusative, genitive, and dative—and three grammatical genders—feminine, masculine, and neuter. Nouns may also be either singular or plural; in the plural, one declension is used regardless of gender―meaning that plural can be treated as a fourth "gender" for the purposes of declining articles and adjectives. However, the nouns themselves retain several ways of forming plurals which often, but not always, correspond with the word's gender and structure in the singular.  For example, many feminine nouns which, in the singular, end in e, like die Reise ("the journey"), form the plural by adding -n: die Reisen ("the journeys"). Many neuter or masculine nouns ending in a consonant, like das Blatt or der Baum ("the leaf" and "the tree") form plurals by a change of vowel and appending -er or -e: die Blätter and die Bäume  ("the leaves", "the trees").  Historically, these and several further plural inflections recall the noun declension classes of Proto-Germanic, but in much reduced form.

Articles

Definite article 

The definite articles (der, etc.) correspond to the English "the".

Indefinite article 
The indefinite articles (ein, etc.) correspond to English "a", "an". Note: ein is also a numeral which corresponds to English "one" (i.e. 1).

Ein has no plural; as in English, the plural indefinite article is null, as in "There are cows in the field." ("Es gibt Kühe auf dem Felde."). Instead, the declension of the pronoun kein (no, not any, not one) is given, which follows the plural paradigm.

Adjectival pronouns 
Certain adjectival pronouns also decline like der: all-, dies-, jed-, jen-, manch-, solch-, welch-. These are called der-words (Der-Wort).

The general declension pattern is as shown in the following table:

Examples:

Adjectival possessive pronouns (or possessive determiners) and kein decline similarly to the article ein.
The general declension pattern is as shown in the following table:

Examples:

Euer is slightly irregular: when it has an ending, its stem may be reduced to eur-, e.g. dative masculine eurem (also euerem).

Nouns 

Only the following nouns are declined according to case:
 Masculine weak nouns gain an -n (sometimes -en) at the end in cases other than the singular nominative. e.g. der Student, des Studenten.
 A handful of masculine "mixed" nouns, the most common of which is Name, gain an -ns at the end in the singular genitive, e.g. der Name, des Namens, and otherwise behave exactly like weak nouns.
 The genitive case of other nouns of masculine or neuter gender is formed by adding either -s or -es, e.g. das Bild, des Bildes.
 Nouns in plural that do not already end in -n or -s (the latter mostly found in loanwords) gain an -n in the dative case. e.g. der Berg, die Berge, den Bergen. Most of these nouns are either masculine or neuter, but there is a group of feminine nouns that are declined in this way too. While this group comprises only a small minority of feminine nouns, it includes some of the most oft-used nouns in the language. e.g. die Hand, die Hände, den Händen.
 The irregular neuter noun Herz behaves almost exactly like the masculine "mixed" nouns, except that it is not inflected in the singular accusative and inflection in the singular dative is optional especially in spoken German, e.g. das Herz, das Herz, dem Herzen or dem Herz, des Herzens.

There is a dative singular marking -e associated with strong masculine or neuter nouns, e.g. der Tod and das Bad, but this is rarely regarded as a required ending in contemporary usage, with the exception of fossilized phrases, such as zum Tode verurteilt ("sentenced to death"), or titles of creative works, e.g. Venus im Bade ("Venus in the Bath"): In these cases, the omission of the ending would be unusual. It also retains a certain level of productivity in poetry and music where it may be used to help with meter and rhyme, as well as in extremely elevated prose (such as might be found on memorial plaques).

Pronouns

Personal pronouns 
The genitive case for personal pronouns is currently considered archaic and is used only in certain archaic expressions like "ich bedarf seiner" (I need him). This is not to be confused with possessive adjectives.

Note that unlike in English, "er" and "sie" can refer to any masculine or feminine noun, not just persons, while "es" can refer to a person described by a neuter  noun: "das Kind, es..."; "das Mädchen, es..."

Interrogative pronouns 

 Generally, prepositions that need to be followed by either case merge with "was" to form new words such as "wovon" ("whereof" / "whence [from where]") or "weswegen" ("for what reason").

Relative pronouns

Possessive pronouns 

Possessive pronouns are treated as articles in German and decline the same way as kein; see Indefinite article above.

Demonstrative pronouns 

These may be used in place of personal pronouns to provide emphasis, as in the sentence "Den sehe ich" ("I see that"). Also note the word ordering: den corresponds to "that", and ich corresponds to "I". Placing the object at the beginning of the sentence places emphasis on it. English, as a generally non-declined language, does not normally show similar behavior, although it is sometimes possible to place the object at the front of a sentence for similar emphasis, as in: "Him I see, but I don't see John".

The table is the same as for relative pronouns.

Reflexive pronouns 

Reflexive pronouns are used when a subject and object are the same, as in Ich wasche mich "I wash myself".

Indefinite pronouns 
The pronoun man refers to a generic person, and is usually translated as one (or generic you). It is equivalent to the French pronoun on.

Adjectives

Predicate adjectives 
Predicate adjectives (e.g. kalt in mir ist kalt "I am cold") are undeclined.

Attributive adjectives

Strong inflection 

Strong adjective declension is used when:
 there is no preceding article; or 
 the preceding article does not fully indicate the case, gender, and number of the noun.

Here is an example.

Note that the ending for genitive masculine and neuter is -en. This is a source of confusion for learners, who typically assume it is -es, and also native speakers, who interpret the pronouns called der-words (Der-Wort), for example jed-, as adjectives with no article, to be declined strongly.

Weak inflection 

Weak adjective declension is used when the article itself clearly indicates case, gender, and number.

Mixed inflection 
Source:

Mixed adjective declension is used when there is a preceding indefinite article (e.g. ein-, kein-), or possessive determiner (mein-, dein-, ihr-, etc.). It is like the weak inflection, but in forms where the weak inflection has the ending -e, the mixed inflection replaces these with the forms of the strong inflection (shown in light blue).

Undeclined geographic attributive words 
Many German locality names have an attributive word associated with them which ends in -er, for example Berliner for Berlin and Hamburger for Hamburg, which are not marked for case but always end in -er. Die Berliner Mauer (‘the Berlin Wall’) and das Brandenburger Tor (‘the Brandenburg Gate’) are prominent examples of this.  Note the -er ending despite the neuter gender of the word Tor. If the place name ends in -en, like Göttingen, the -er usually replaces the terminal -en.

See also
Archaic Dutch declension

References